The Campeonato Nacional is the top level women's futsal league in Portugal, organized by the Portuguese Football Federation. The competition, which is played under UEFA rules, currently consists of 16 teams.

Champions

The Campeonato Nacional was organized for the first time in season 2013/14 and was won by Golpilheira.

References 

Futsal competitions in Portugal
Women's futsal leagues